Kunnappillissery is a place situated near Angamaly, Ernakulam district in the state of Kerala, India. It is 7 kilometres south
from Angamaly and 12 km north from Cochin International Airport.
The nearest railway
station is Angamaly.

References 

Villages in Ernakulam district